Upkar is a 1967 Indian Hindi film directed by Manoj Kumar. The film held the top spot at the box office in 1967. It was Manoj Kumar's directorial debut film. Then India's prime minister Lal Bahadur Shastri suggested Kumar make a film based on our farmers and soldiers. It was the highest-grossing movie of the year. It is considered an evergreen classic film.

The film is based on the backdrop of a war of 1965, it praised the village life, farmers' and soldiers' contributions to the nation. It was praised for its story, photography, songs, lyrics, and acting.

The movie also stars Asha Parekh as a doctor promoting family planning, Kamini Kaushal, and Pran in his first positive character role. Madan Puri played the main villain with ease, full ability, and command. The film won several major awards.

Plot 

Manoj Kumar plays a village man called Bharat, who sacrifices everything to get his brother educated. His brother, Puran, goes to study in the city and gets attracted to the high society lifestyle. He comes back to the village as a selfish man wanting his share of the property. Bharat is unwilling to divide the property and transfers the full property land to Puran's son to prevent Puran from selling the land.

But, when the war of 1965 between India and Pakistan breaks out, Bharat goes to the war front; while his selfish brother, with the help of his greedy uncle Charandas and some partners, tries to gain profit by hoarding and black marketing grains in the market. But later Puran discovers Charandas' plan to separate Puran from Bharat and, ridden with guilt and shame, surrenders to the police.

Bharat fights bravely in the war but is captured by the enemy. He later manages to escape but is badly injured and loses both his hands. In the end, Bharat returns as a war hero, his brother apologizes and both brothers again start to live in the village, working hard in the fields as farmers.

Cast
 Manoj Kumar - Bharat
 Mahesh Kothare - Younger Bharat

 Asha Parekh - Dr. Kavita
 Prem Chopra - Puran ‘Kumar’
 Kanhaiyalal - Lala Dhaniram
 Pran - Malang Chacha
 David - Major saab
 Kamini Kaushal - Radha 
 Asit Sen - Lakhpati
 Tun Tun - Lakhpati's Wife
 Madan Puri - Charan Das
 Manmohan - Kavita's Brother
 Aruna Irani - Kamli
 Manmohan Krishan - Bisna
 Sunder - Sunder
 Gulshan Bawra - Som
Mohan Choti - Mangal
Laxmi Chhaya - Guest dancer in  "Gulabi Raat Gulabi"

Background
Prime Minister Lal Bahadur Shastri praised his earlier film Shaheed and enthused Manoj Kumar to make a film on the Jai Jawan Jai Kisan slogan. The slogan shaped into Manoj Kumar's official debut as a director for Upkar, where he believably played both a jawan and a kisan. A huge hit, Upkar made Manoj an authority on screen patriotism.

According to an interview of Manoj Kumar, Rajesh Khanna was originally signed for the film, but before the shooting kicked off he won the All India Talent Contest organised by United Producers and Filmfare and thus had to withdraw. Prem Chopra replaced him.

Most parts of the movie were shot in Atali village near Ballabgarh (Haryana) and Ghevra Village near Bawana, Delhi. The Shiv Temple shown in the film is located in Ghevra, including the songs "Kasme Vaade" and "Mere Desh Ki Dharti", then Manoj Kumar purchased a Bagh (property) in that area named Vishal Bagh on Main Bawana Road at Narela, Delhi NCT.

Production 

 Origin - India's second prime minister Lal Bahadur Shastri suggested Manoj Kumar to make a movie based on his slogan Jai Jawan Jai Kisan. After India defeated Pakistan in 1965 war. Shastri wanted to raise moral of the country. 
 Principal photography-

The principal photography happened at Nangal Thakran village of Delhi state. It is present on North East side of New Delhi. The film unit took bullock carts, ploughs from the villagers for filming, house of the village are used for Bharat (Manoj Kumar) house. The cast and production used to arrive at morning for filming and used to return to Delhi at night. They lived in the village during filming of night sequences.  The field of one of the resident of village is used as of Bharat, where "Mere Desh Ki Dharti " song was filmed. Some portions are filmed in Rajkamal Kala-mandir studio, Kamal studio, Gurudatt studio and Mehaboob studio.

Soundtrack
The film's music was given by Kalyanji Anandji. Lyrics for Upkar were penned by Qamar Jalalabadi, Indeevar, Gulshan Bawra, and Sitaram Dhawan. The song, "Mere Desh Ki Dharti Sona Ugle Ugle Heere Moti, Mere Desh Ki Dharti", sung by Mahendra Kapoor was a chartbuster.

Reception 
The songs of Upkar became hit. Still the song "Mere Desh Ki Dharti" is played during Republic day and Independence day of India.

Many years later, Manoj Kumar said that one of the most beautiful screen images that stuck in his mind was a "half-lit Asha Parekh" in this film.

Awards and nominations

 15th Filmfare Awards:

Won

 Best Film – V. I. P. Films
 Best Director – Manoj Kumar
 Best Supporting Actor – Pran
 Best Lyricist – Gulshan Bawra for "Mere Desh Ki Dharti"
 Best Story – Manoj Kumar
 Best Dialogue – Manoj Kumar
 Best Editing – B. S. Glaad

Nominated

 Best Actor – Manoj Kumar
 Best Music Director – Kalyanji–Anandji
 Best Male Playback Singer – Mahendra Kapoor for "Mere Desh Ki Dharti"

Other Awards

National Film Award for Second Best Feature Film--Manoj Kumar
National Film Award for Best Male Playback Singer --Mahendra Kapoor for the song "Mere Desh Ki Dharti"
BFJA Award for Best Dialogue (Hindi)--Manoj Kumar

References

External links 
 
 Upkar Film review and synopsis

1967 films
1960s Hindi-language films
1967 drama films
Films scored by Kalyanji Anandji
Second Best Feature Film National Film Award winners
1967 directorial debut films
Films directed by Manoj Kumar
Memorials to Lal Bahadur Shastri